Women's shot put events for athletes with cerebral palsy were held at the 2004 Summer Paralympics in the Athens Olympic Stadium. Events were held in three disability classes or ranges, F32-34 being held jointly with F52/53 wheelchair athletes.

F32-34/52/53

F35/36

The F35/36 event was won by Veronika Foltova, representing .

23 September 2004, 09:00

F37/38

The F37/38 event was won by Aldona Grigaliuniene, representing .

27 September 2004, 09:00

References

W
2004 in women's athletics